Charles James McDonald (July 9, 1793December 16, 1860) was an American attorney, jurist and politician.

He was born in Charleston, South Carolina and moved with his family to Hancock County, Georgia in 1794.

He served as a brigadier general in the Georgia Militia from 1823 to 1825.

McDonald served as the 37th Governor of Georgia from 1839 to 1843, defeating the Whig candidate William Crosby Dawson. In addition to serving in the Georgia Senate and Georgia House of Representatives, McDonald also served as a justice of the Supreme Court of Georgia.

McDonald died in Marietta, Georgia in 1860 and was buried in the Episcopal Cemetery in that same city.

References

 The New Georgia Encyclopedia entry
 Georgia Governor's Gravesites Field Guide (1776-2003)

External links
Gov. Charles James McDonald historical marker

Stuart A. Rose Manuscript, Archives, and Rare Book Library, Emory University: Charles James McDonald papers, 1834-1854

1793 births
1860 deaths
Politicians from Charleston, South Carolina
People from Hancock County, Georgia
University of South Carolina alumni
Democratic Party governors of Georgia (U.S. state)
Democratic Party members of the Georgia House of Representatives
Democratic Party Georgia (U.S. state) state senators
Justices of the Supreme Court of Georgia (U.S. state)
Lawyers from Charleston, South Carolina
19th-century American politicians
19th-century American judges
19th-century American lawyers